Bell Grove is an unincorporated community in Nodaway County, in the U.S. state of Missouri.

The community has the name of William Bell, a pioneer citizen.

References

Unincorporated communities in Nodaway County, Missouri
Unincorporated communities in Missouri